The Mississippi Valley Conference (also called MVC) is a high-school athletic conference whose members are located in the metropolitan areas of eastern region of the U.S. state of Iowa, including Cedar Rapids, Dubuque, Iowa City and Waterloo-Cedar Falls.

The conference is divided into two divisions: the Mississippi division and the Valley division. Division assignments rotate every two years, and are not geographically-based.

At present the MVC comprises all 4A schools with the exception of Dubuque Wahlert, which is categorized as 3A school. Cedar Rapids Xavier, when admitted to the MVC, was a 3A school, but became a 4A school beginning with the 2008-09 school year. As of 2014-2015, Xavier switched back to 3A and Western Dubuque high school, also a 3A school, beginning in 2019.

Member schools
There are 15 member schools of the Mississippi Valley Conference:

Mississippi Division

Valley Division

History
Since its founding, the Mississippi Valley Conference was a league composed of metropolitan schools in eastern Iowa. Until 1969, the MVC (as it is known to some locals) also included Quad-City area schools in both Iowa and Illinois; this list included Davenport High (since 1960, Davenport Central) and Davenport West in Iowa; and Illinois Quad-City area schools East Moline (now United Township), Moline and Rock Island. Clinton High School was also a member of the conference, as were Jefferson and Washington of Cedar Rapids, Iowa City High and Dubuque Senior (known for years simply as Dubuque). Cedar Rapids Kennedy joined immediately upon its opening in 1967.

The league was reorganized in 1969, with the five Quad-City area schools leaving to form a new league (the Quad-City Metro Conference, along with Catholic schools Davenport Assumption and Rock Island Alleman). The six remaining schools were joined by newcomers Bettendorf, Muscatine and Iowa City West (the latter which opened in 1968). Early in 1970, the newly opened Dubuque Hempstead was admitted to the conference.

One member - Muscatine - gained infamy during the 1970s when it lost 44 consecutive football games, including 40 straight league games between 1973 and 1977.1

The league reorganized again in 1978 when Bettendorf, Clinton and Muscatine left to join the newly formed Mississippi Athletic Conference; Dubuque Wahlert joined at that time to make the MVC an eight-team conference.

Linn-Mar and Cedar Rapids Prairie leave the disbanded East Iowa Conference and join the Mississippi Valley conference for 1986-87 school year

Waterloo East, Waterloo West, Cedar Falls, and Cedar Rapids Regis joined the conference in 1992. Regis was later merged with Cedar Rapids LaSalle High School to form Cedar Rapids Xavier High School. Periodically conference membership is reviewed based on school population trends.2

In 2016, Liberty, a new high school part of the Iowa City Community School District, applied for membership in the Mississippi Valley Conference. In January 2017, Western Dubuque accepted an invitation to join the league, joining from the WaMaC Conference. The additions became effective with the 2018-2019 school year, marking the first expansion of the conference since 1992, with the only change coming in 1998 with Xavier's opening.

In the spring of 2021, Waterloo East's request to depart the conference after the 2021-2022 school year was approved by the Waterloo School District, to join the new Iowa Alliance Conference that also includes 10 former Central Iowa Metro League schools. East's move came after a trend where the Trojans ranked near or at the bottom of the conference's all-sports rankings as well as decreasing sports participation. Waterloo West did not pursue a change at this time, and no other MVC school has made an indication of plans to switch to any new conference.

Sports
The conference offers the following sports: 

 Fall — Football, volleyball, boys' cross-country, girls' cross-country, boys' golf and girls' swimming.
 Winter — Boys' basketball, girls' basketball, bowling, wrestling and boys' swimming.
 Spring — Boys' track and field, girls' track and field, boys' soccer, girls' soccer, boys' tennis, girls' tennis and girls' golf.
 Summer — Baseball and softball.

Although the member schools field freshman — and in some cases, junior varsity — teams in many of the above-mentioned sports, conference championships are determined at sophomore and varsity levels only.

In other states
Two other states have high-school athletic conferences named Mississippi Valley Conference.  In Illinois, the Mississippi Valley Conference is a conference based in the Metro East area, the eastern suburbs of St. Louis, Missouri.  In Wisconsin, the Mississippi Valley Conference is a conference based in the La Crosse area, commonly known as the Coulee Region.

References

 1"Thank God it's over!" Sports article from the Muscatine Journal, September 10, 1978.
 2"Xavier grows into a Class 4A school" Sports article from the Cedar Rapids Gazette, March 12, 2008.

External links
 Official site

High school sports conferences and leagues in the United States
High school sports in Iowa